Titanic is a census-designated place (CDP) in Adair County, Oklahoma, United States. The population was 356 at the 2010 census. It was presumably named after the famous ocean liner RMS Titanic.

A post office was established in Titanic, on January 3, 1916, but discontinued on December 31, 1927, with mail to Stilwell.

Geography

Demographics

References

Census-designated places in Adair County, Oklahoma
Census-designated places in Oklahoma